The Beytussebab rebellion was the first Kurdish rebellion in the modern Republic of Turkey. The revolt was led by Halid Beg Cibran of the Cibran tribe. Other prominent commanders where Ihsan Nuri and Yusuf Ziya Bey. Its causes laid in opposition to the abolition of the Ottoman Caliphate in 1923, the repressive Turkish policies towards Kurdish identity, the prohibition of public use and teaching of the Kurdish languages, and the resettling of Kurdish landowners and tribal chiefs in the west of the country. Numerous officers of the Turkish army deserted for the rebellion. The rebellion began in August 1924, when the garrison of Beytüşşebap revolted against the Turkish government. The rebellion proved unsuccessful, and ended shortly after it began. Yusuf Ziya Bey was arrested on the 10 October 1924 and reportedly accused Halid Beg Cibran of having been also involved in the revolt. Halid Beg Cibran was captured in Erzurum in December 1924. Both  were courtmartialed in Bitlis. Although the rebellion was suppressed, another Kurdish uprising, the Sheikh Said rebellion, would begin the next year.

Further reading

References 

Conflicts in 1924
1924 in Turkey
Kurdish–Turkish conflict